Crestline may refer to:

Places in the United States of America

 Crestline, a village in Mountain Brook, Alabama
 Crestline, California
 Crestline, Kansas
 Crestline, Ohio

Other uses

 Crestline Coach, a manufacturer of special and emergency vehicles based in Saskatchewan
 Crestline, code name of the Intel Mobile 965 Express chipset, part of Intel's Santa Rosa platform
 Ford Crestline, an automobile produced 1952-54